American country music band Zac Brown Band has released seven studio albums, two extended plays, two live albums, and twenty-nine singles. Fourteen of those singles reached number one on either the US Billboard Hot Country Songs or Country Airplay chart, while one reached number one on the Billboard Mainstream Rock chart.

In 2008, they released their debut single, "Chicken Fried". It became their first number-one single on the country singles charts and also became a top 20 hit on the Billboard Hot 100. Their major label debut album, The Foundation was released November 18, 2008. It featured four additional singles, including the number ones "Toes", "Highway 20 Ride", and "Free".

In 2010, a duet with Alan Jackson was released as the lead-off single to their second album, You Get What You Give. The album's first four singles, "As She's Walking Away", "Colder Weather", "Knee Deep", and "Keep Me in Mind" all became Number One hits.

Their third album, Uncaged, was released on July 10, 2012. It features the singles "The Wind", "Goodbye in Her Eyes", "Jump Right In", and "Sweet Annie".

The band's second extended play, The Grohl Sessions, Vol. 1, was released on December 10, 2013, and features the single "All Alright", which was released on April 28, 2014.

The band's fourth studio album, Jekyll + Hyde, was released on April 28, 2015. It features the singles "Homegrown", "Heavy Is the Head", Loving You Easy", "Junkyard", "Beautiful Drug", and "Castaway". "Heavy Is the Head" and "Junkyard" were both released as rock singles, with "Heavy Is the Head" becoming the band's first number-one single on the Billboard Mainstream Rock chart.

Their fifth album, Welcome Home, was released on May 12, 2017, and featured the singles "My Old Man" and "Roots".

Their sixth album, The Owl, was released on September 20, 2019. The album produced two singles: "Someone I Used to Know" and "Leaving Love Behind".

On October 15, 2021, the band released The Comeback, their seventh studio album. The Comeback was the band's first album since The Foundation to not reach number one on the Billboard Top Country Albums chart. The album has produced the singles "Same Boat" and "Out in the Middle". "Same Boat" was the band's first single to reach number one on the Billboard Country Airplay chart since "Beautiful Drug" in 2016.

Studio albums

2000s albums

2010s and 2020s albums
{| class="wikitable plainrowheaders" style="text-align:center;"
|-
! scope="col" rowspan="2" style="width:14em;"| Title
! scope="col" rowspan="2" style="width:24em;"| Album details
! scope="col" colspan="5"| Peak chart positions
! scope="col" rowspan="2" style="width:13em;"| Sales
! scope="col" rowspan="2" style="width:11em;"| Certifications(sales threshold)
|-
! scope="col" style="width:4.5em;font-size:85%;"| US
! scope="col" style="width:4.5em;font-size:85%;"| US Country
! scope="col" style="width:4.5em;font-size:85%;"| AUS<ref name="AUS">Peaks in Australia:
 All except noted: 
 ''Greatest Hits So Far...: </ref>
! scope="col" style="width:4.5em;font-size:85%;"| CAN
! scope="col" style="width:4.5em;font-size:85%;"| UK Country
|-
! scope="row"| You Get What You Give
|
 Release date: September 21, 2010
 Label: Atlantic/Southern Ground/Bigger Picture
 Formats: CD, music download
| 1 || 1 || — || 12 || —
| style="text-align:left;"|
 US: 1,900,000
| style="text-align:left;"|
 US: 3× Platinum
 CAN: Gold
|-
! scope="row"| Uncaged
|
 Release date: July 10, 2012
 Label: Atlantic/Southern Ground/RPM
 Formats: CD, music download
| 1 || 1 || 38 || 1 || 4
| style="text-align:left;"|
 US: 1,200,000
| style="text-align:left;"|
 US: Platinum
 CAN: Gold
|-
! scope="row"| Jekyll + Hyde
|
 Release date: April 28, 2015
 Label: John Varvatos Records/Big Machine Label Group/Republic Records
 Formats: CD, music download
| 1 || 1 || 6 || 1 || 2
| style="text-align:left;"|
 US: 672,400
 CAN: 15,000
|
 US: Platinum
 CAN: Gold
|-
! scope="row"| Welcome Home
|
 Release date: May 12, 2017
 Label: Elektra Records
 Formats: CD, music download
| 2 || 1 || 8 || 2 || —
| style="text-align:left;"|
 US: 308,600
|
|-
! scope="row"| The Owl
|
 Release date: September 20, 2019
 Label: Wheelhouse, BMG
 Formats: CD, music download
| 2 || 1 || 29 || 39 || —
|
 US: 137,100
|
|-
! scope="row"| The Comeback
|
 Release date: October 15, 2021
 Label: Home Grown/Warner Music Nashville
 Formats: CD, music download
| 27
| 3
| 42
| 64
| —
|
|
|-
| colspan="10" style="font-size:85%"| "—" denotes releases that did not chart.
|}

 Live albums 

 Compilation albums 

 Extended plays 

 Singles 

 2000s singles 

 2010s singles 

 2020s singles Notes'''

Featured singles

Other charted songs

Videography

Music videos

Guest appearances

Album appearances

See also
Sir Rosevelt#Discography
Zac Brown#Discography

References

Country music discographies
Discographies of American artists
Discography